Wake Me When It's Over is a 1960 DeLuxe Color comedy film directed by Mervyn LeRoy and starring Ernie Kovacs and Dick Shawn in CinemaScope. The screenplay concerns a World War II veteran who gets called back into service by mistake and sent to a dreary Pacific island. The film is based on the novel of the same name by Howard Singer. The title song was written by Sammy Cahn (words) and James Van Heusen (music) and sung by Andy Williams.

Plot
Gus Brubaker (Dick Shawn) is a self-described schnook. Soon after the end of the Korean War, his wife talks him into applying for G.I. insurance for which he is eligible from his World War II service with the Air Force. Gus is reluctant because he was shot down and became a prisoner of war, but the military listed him as killed. A red-tape foulup results in Gus being back in uniform, assigned to a ramshackle radar station on a backwater island near Shima, Japan. Boredom has made the airmen assigned there apathetic, slovenly, and unmotivated. Its equipment and supplies are a collection of junk, abandoned or surplus.

Capt. Charlie Stark (Ernie Kovacs), a free-wheeling nonconformist Air Force pilot, is in charge. His superiors have all but forgotten the base is still on the island. Gus gets to know Ume Tanaka (Nobu McCarthy), daughter of the village's unfriendly mayor, who shows him a pool of natural hot springs. Gus and Charlie conspire to open a resort hotel, using the men as labor and the broken-down equipment as materials, with Doc Farringtom (Warden) scamming journalist Joab Martinson (Robert Emhardt) about the water's "healing powers" to gain free publicity.

Doc summons no-nonsense Lt. Nora McKay (Margo Moore) to lend a woman's touch to the project, and Charlie develops a romantic interest in her. The airmen, including Charlie, are motivated by the project and their pretty young lieutenant, become a military outfit again, and construct a first-class facility, the Hotel Shima. Nora staffs the hotel with 40 young women from the village, and following local custom, the girls are "sold" for two years to Gus as their "papa-san" at the insistence of their fathers. Nora and Charlie fall in love, but when he asks her to marry him, she is doubtful that he is marriage material.

When Martinson gets drunk and embarrasses himself in front of all the guests, he vindictively writes a story painting the hotel as a den of sin. Gus is court-martialed as a scapegoat despite the fact that 100 airmen are its owners. When Charlie becomes outraged and demands to testify, he is transferred by his reputation-conscious commander to prevent it. A congressional panel from Washington, DC also launches an investigation, Charlie ends up buzzing the trial in a jet as Doc Farrington blackmails Colonel Hollingsworth with the knowledge that he received Hotel Shima-supplied luxury goods. Stark ends up testifying on Gus's behalf while all sorts of crazy antics occur during the trial.

Ultimately, Brubaker is found not guilty on one count, but guilty of taking government property. During sentencing, the court discovers it has tried the wrong man due to the earlier government error. Stymied, the panel finally decides to find Gus not guilty and leave the hotel to the people of the island. Charlie and Nora reconcile from an earlier disagreement over the trial and decide to marry. As Gus says goodbye to Ume and sets off to leave, he sees that Colonel Hollingsworth (now demoted to sergeant) has been assigned to the base in his place. Ume waves goodbye as Gus starts for home.

Cast

 Ernie Kovacs as Captain Charlie Stark
 Dick Shawn as Gus Brubaker
 Margo Moore as First Lieutenant Nora McKay
 Jack Warden as Captain Dave "Doc" Farrington
 Nobu McCarthy as Ume Tanaka (as Nobu Atsumi McCarthy)
 Don Knotts as Staff Sergeant Percy Warren
 Robert Strauss as Technical Sergeant Sam Weiscoff
 Noreen Nash as Marge Brubaker
 Parley Baer as Colonel Archie Hollingsworth
 Robert Emhardt as Joab Martinson
 Marvin Kaplan as Hap Cosgrove
 Tommy Nishimura as Private Jim Harigawa
 Raymond Bailey as General Weigang
 Vin Scully as a CBS reporter
 Judy Dan as Geisha Girl (uncredited)

See also
 List of American films of 1960

References

External links
 
 
 
 

1960 films
1960 comedy films
American comedy films
Films based on American novels
Films directed by Mervyn LeRoy
Films scored by Cyril J. Mockridge
Military humor in film
20th Century Fox films
CinemaScope films
Films about the United States Air Force
Films set on islands
Films set in Japan
1960s English-language films
1960s American films